Athletics events at the 1982 Southern Cross Games were held at the Centro de Alto Rendimiento Deportivo Pedro Candioti (CARD), equipped with one of the first synthetic tracks in Argentina, in Santa Fe, Argentina.  A total of 39 events were contested, 23 by men and 16 by women.

Medal summary

Medal winners were published in a book written by Argentinian journalist Ernesto Rodríguez III with support of the Argentine Olympic Committee (Spanish: Comité Olímpico Argentino) under the auspices of the Ministry of Education (Spanish: Ministerio de Educación de la Nación) in collaboration with the Office of Sports (Spanish: Secretaría de Deporte de la Nación).  Eduardo Biscayart supplied the list of winners and their results.

Men

Women

Medal table (unofficial)

References

1982
1982 Southern Cross Games
Southern Cross Games
1982 Southern Cross Games